A notorious market is a website or physical market where, according to the Office of the United States Trade Representative (USTR), large-scale intellectual property infringement takes place. Officially termed Notorious Markets for Counterfeiting and Piracy, the USTR has generated a yearly list of such notorious markets since 2006 with input from various industry groups.

History
Since 2006, the members of the International Intellectual Property Alliance in conjunction with the Office of the United States Trade Representative has annually filed a list of Notorious Markets as a part of their Special 301 Report to the U.S. federal government. It lists virtual markets (websites) and physical markets outside of the US where large scale copyright infringement takes place and recommends trade sanctions for countries with weak copyright protection enforcement. Since 2010 the list is separately issued as a part of an out-of-cycle review between the main report submissions.

Whilst the list of markets does not directly form national trade policy, the report says
"[t]he United States encourages the responsible authorities to step up efforts to combat piracy and counterfeiting in these and similar markets."

List creation process
The notorious market list is created following input from the Recording Industry Association of America (RIAA) and Motion Picture Association (MPAA), as well as other industry groups. The goal of the list is to encourage governments to take action against intellectual property violations, as well as encouraging markets to reform. Sites include torrenting websites such as The Pirate Bay, stream ripping sites, and sites for cheating in online games.

List

Reports

See also 
 Special 301 Report

References

Reports
In the text these references are preceded by a double dagger (‡):

 
2006 establishments in the United States